The expression Laissez les bons temps rouler (alternatively Laissez le bon temps rouler) is a Cajun French phrase.  The phrase is a calque of the English phrase "let the good times roll"; that is a word for word translation of the English phrase into Cajun French.

This phrase is often mentioned in Louisiana (especially New Orleans) and around the Gulf Coast where Mardi Gras is celebrated.  It is well known touristically around the United States from television and radio.

See also

 Joie de vivre, a phrase with a similar sentiment
 Mardi Gras

References

French words and phrases
Culture of New Orleans